Willpower is the second studio album by the American band Today Is the Day, released on September 1994 by Amphetamine Reptile Records. The album was recorded just a few months after Steve Austin's father, whom he had not seen for months at the time, died in a violent car crash. A remastered edition of the album was issued in 2007 through the then-newly formed SuperNova Records, which included the track "Execution Style", a rare extra from the Willpower sessions that remained previously unreleased up to that point.

A live performance that was recorded during the tour to promote Willpower was released as a DVD via SuperNova, under the title of Willpower Live in 2007.

It is the only album of the band to have been recorded with the same lineup as the prior album.

Reception

Patrick Kennedy of AllMusic awarded the album 4 and a half out of 5 stars, saying, "Though its time signatures are still tricky in a mathematical way, Willpower's greatest strength is its appeal to the human heart through whatever means necessary."

Track listing

"Willpower" contains dialogue from the 1990 film Goodfellas.
"Promised Land" contains dialogue from the 1955 film Rebel Without a Cause.

Personnel
Adapted from the Willpower liner notes.

Today Is the Day
Steve Austin – vocals, guitar, sampler, production, engineering, mastering
Brad Elrod – drums
Mike Herrell – bass guitar

Production
Al Sutton – engineering

Release history

References

External links 
 
 Willpower at Bandcamp

1994 albums
Today Is the Day albums
Amphetamine Reptile Records albums